A by-election was held for the New South Wales Legislative Assembly electorate of Darling Harbour on 13 April 1910. The by-election was triggered by the resignation of John Norton to unsuccessfully contest 1910 federal Senate election for NSW.

The by-election and those for Queanbeyan and Upper Hunter were held on the same day as the 1910 Federal election.

Dates

Results

John Norton resigned to unsuccessfully contest the 1910 federal Senate election for NSW.

See also
Electoral results for the district of Darling Harbour
List of New South Wales state by-elections

Notes

References

New South Wales state by-elections
1910 elections in Australia
1910s in New South Wales